Rittō may refer to:
Rittō, Shiga, a city in Japan
Rittō, the 19th solar term, among the 24, of the traditional East Asian calendars. See Lidong